"Can't Believe It" is a song by American rapper Flo Rida. The song features a rap verse from Cuban-American rapper Pitbull. The song samples "Infinity" by London-based duo Infinity Ink. The music video for "Can't Believe It" was directed by Geremey and Georgie Legs.

Chart performance

Weekly charts

Year-end charts

Certifications

|-

References

2013 singles
2013 songs
Flo Rida songs
Pitbull (rapper) songs
Atlantic Records singles
Songs written by Mike Caren
Songs written by Pitbull (rapper)
Songs written by Flo Rida
Songs written by Breyan Isaac
Songs written by Cook Classics